SpareBank 1 Nordvest is a Norwegian savings bank with branches in Nordmøre in addition to Molde and Ålesund. The bank has 11 branch offices with a head office in Kristiansund and has total assets of NOK 5 billion. The bank is part of the bank alliances SpareBank 1 and Samarbeidende Sparebanker.

There are branch offices located in Averøy, Eide, Frei, Gjemnes, Halsa, Kristiansund, Molde, Smøla, Tingvoll, Tustna, Ålesund.

History
The bank can trace its roots back to 1835 when Kristiansunds Sparebank was created. During the 1960s Kristiansunds Sparebank merged with some other local savings banks. In 1973 the two banks in Kristiansund merged with each other in addition to Øre and Smølen and changed its name to Nordmøre Sparebank. In 2000 the bank took the brand name SpareBank 1 when it joined the SpareBank 1 alliance and changed its juridical name to Sparebanken Nordvest. The bank also took over VÅR Bank's operations in Møre and Romsdal when it was bought by SpareBank 1. The bank markets itself as SpareBank 1 Ålesund in Ålesund.

List of banks that merged
 Bremnes Sparebank (1908)
 Frei Sparebank (1912)
 Halsa Spaebank (1909)
 Kristiansunds Sparebank (1835)
 Kristiansunds Spareskillingsbank (1861)
 Kvernes Sparebank (1894)
 Smølen Sparebank (1903)
 Straumsnes Sparebank (1920)
 Tustna Sparebank (1912)
 Valsøyfjord Sparebank (1895)
 Øre Sparebank (1910)

External links

 SpareBank 1 Norvest web site

Banks of Norway
Banks established in 1835
Companies based in Kristiansund
SpareBank 1
Norwegian companies established in 1835